Thenadu or Thinadhoo is the capital of Gaafu Dhaalu region in the atoll of Huvadhu and the proposed capital for the Upper South Province of the Maldives. It has its own dialect of Dhivehi which is considerably different from northern speech.

It is pronounced as Thenadu in the Southern Maldives dialect.

The name Thinadhoo is derived from Euphorbia hirta, locally known as Thina Vina (Thina Weed) a pantropical weed used for herbal medicines which grew in the island.

The island was formerly known as Havaru Thinadhoo and it was the traditional seat of the Atoll Chief. The island has a vibrant history of unrest and revolution.

Thinadhoo was the wealthiest island in the country before it was forcefully depopulated and demolished entirely in 1962. The rich merchants of the island was known to have assisted even the capital when in need.

History

Early history
Written history of the island is sparse, but Thinadhoo is known to have a rich history.

Havaru Thinadhoo

The Havaru, also known as the military factions were sent to Thinadhoo during the time of Bodu Thakurufaanu.

When 'havaru' were given these six regions they leased them to the people of Thinadhoo under the Vaaru system. Each year Thinadhoo people were to send the annual Varuvaa (Tax) to the 'Havaru' based in Male'. This practice lasted till the sultanate of  Muhammad Mueenuddeen I who was the sultan of the Maldives from 1798 to 1835.

In addition to Thinadhoo there were 3 other islands undertaken by the Havaru. They were Kaadedhoo, Kannigili Kolhu and Kubbudu in Huvadhoo Atoll.

During the time of Havaru, the island of Thinadhoo used Kaadedhoo for farming.

Annual varuvaa or tax 
The annual varuvaa (tax) sent to the Huvaru in Male' from Thinadhoo included:

 300 Boduvattey Bondi (a local type of dish)
 1200 Kuduvatti (a local type of dish)
 1200 Kaadeddhoo Kuna (local woven mat)
 1 Hulhevi Kuna (local mat) from each household.
 16 Wood blocks
 1 Bokkura (a small local boat)
 2 teaspoon of coconut oil from each person in Thinadhoo
 1 Boikotte Boli (a type of shell) from each person in Thinadhoo

Ha Varu (Havaru or Six militia divisions) 
The Ha Varu were organized as two ranks of three divisions each:

Is Thin Varu (Lead rank with three divisions)

 Dhoshimeynaa Varu
 Velaanaa Varu
 Hakuraa Varu

Fas Thin Varu (Rear rank with three divisions)

 Maafaiy Varu
 Dhaharaa Varu
 Faamuladheyri Varu.

Muhammad Thakurufaanu Al Auzam offered havaru the island of Thinadhoo, He ordered that the 'dhandu kolhu', 'medhu ruganddu' and 'Baraaseel' to be given to Havaru along with the islands of Thinadhoo Maahuttaa, Kaadedhdhoo and Kuddu. The island itself was renamed Havaru Thinadhoo signifying the occupation.

United Suvadive Republic

Havaru Thinadhoo was the economic hub of the United Suvadive Republic which formed a breakaway nation from Maldives.

Depopulation of Havaru Thinadhoo 

On the 4th February 1962 the Kingdom of Maldives reacted by sending a fully armed gunboat to Havaru Thinadhoo commanded by Prime Minister Ibrahim Nasir.

Enamaa boat incident 
The Maldive boat Enamaa was carrying far more than its capacity of up to 126 when a wave overturned it. Twenty one people died with two missing when Enamaa capsized into the sea of Gaafu Dhaalu atoll on 17 March 2004.

The Enamaa boat was traveling at nine and a half nautical miles per hour to Thinadhoo Island after watching the home team play a football match in Vilingili Island in Gaafu Alifu atoll.

Geography

Demography

Education
Thinadhoo is served by 4 pre-schools, 2 primary schools, 1 secondary/high-school and 3 university/college campuses.
Maldives National University Thinadhoo Campus
Gaafu Dhaalu Atoll Education Centre
Thinadhoo School
Aboobakuru School
MI Preschool and Daycare
Uloomiyya Pre School
Kangaroo kids M.M. International Preschool
Ameer Ibrahim Pre School
Avid College 
MI College 
Center for the Holy Quran

Transport
Kaadedhdhoo Domestic Airport is situated on a nearby island connected by speed boat.

See also
United Suvadive Republic
Upper South Province
Huvadhu Atoll

References

External links
 YouTube Video: G Dh. Thinadhoo visit by Ibrahim Nasir which led to Genocide 1962

United Suvadive Republic
Populated places in the Maldives
Islands of the Maldives